The Cardadeu Tomàs Balvey Museum-Archive, in Cardedeu, Vallès Oriental, is organised around the legacy of Tomàs Balvey i Bas (1865–1954), the last of a line of apothecaries in Cardedeu. The theme of the museum is based on the pharmacy and its pharmacist, focusing on the world of illness, remedies and health. The Museum-Archive is part of the Barcelona Provincial Council Local Museum Network and of the Catalan Pharmacy Museum Network.

Exhibition
The most iconic element of the Museum-Archive is the old Balvey pharmacy itself, with the original furniture from 1812; more than 200 Empire style pharmacy jars which still hold the original contents; and the shop instruments: Flasks, stills, mortars, etc. In addition to the exhibition, there is a botanical garden with regional vegetation and medicinal herbs that would typically be found in a pharmacist’s garden. The museum collection also includes ethnological, archaeological and decorative materials, as well as a collection of 10th–14th century parchments and documents related to the history of Cardedeu.

References

External links
 Official site
 Local Museum Network site
 Xarxa de Museus de Farmàcia de Catalunya site

Barcelona Provincial Council Local Museum Network
Vallès Oriental
Pharmacy museums
History museums in Catalonia
Medical museums in Spain